Josefine Hewitt is Danish model and beauty pageant titleholder who was crowned Miss Danmark 2012 and represented her country at the Miss Universe 2012 pageant.

Early life
Josefine Hewitt is a professional model. In 2011, She is one of the 15 finalist in Danmarks Næste Topmodel (season 2). A year later, she represented Denmark in the Miss Universe 2012 finals held in December 2012 in Las Vegas, Nevada.

Pretty Danish 2012
Hewitt was appointed as Miss Universe Danmark. She won the title by Pretty Danish Organization in Denmark.

References

External links
Official Miss Danmark Organizations website

Living people
Danish beauty pageant winners
Miss Universe 2012 contestants
Danish female models
1993 births